Senator Geist may refer to:

George Geist (born 1955), New Jersey State Senate
Suzanne Geist (born 1961), Nebraska State Senate